Fakhrabad (also Romanized as Fakhrābād) is a village in Beyza Rural District, Beyza District, Sepidan County, Fars Province, Iran. At the 2006 census, its population was 251, in 56 families.

References 

Populated places in Beyza County